Full of Flowers is an album by the Brazilian composer Milton Pinto. It was released in March, 2010. All lyrics, music and arrangements were composed by Milton Pinto. The album contains four Irish female soloists from the popular Irish choir, the Gardiner Street Gospel Choir, from Dublin, Ireland, who volunteered to record the music. This album features and makes use of vocals influenced from classic to folk and passing through new-age music and Celtic elements, which consists of fifteen numbered tracks categorized by melody as a prime point. The lyrics are sung in English, Italian and Irish. The lyrics are intended to suggest Christian influences rooted into a universal understanding. Recording took place at the Coolin Studio in March 2009, and was managed by the sound engineer Shane Brady.

Track listing

Personnel

Band
 Susan Hurley
 Maria Fenton
 Emer Ní Obhróin
 Anne Hallahan
 Peter Roycroft – All Pianos and Keyboards
 Mossie Landman – Uilleann Pipes and Tin Whistle on Track 14

Album art
All artwork was conceived by Milton Pinto and produced by the graphic designer Fabricio Cavalcante. The cover art was inspired by the Cliffs of Moher, one of the most popular tourist destinations in Ireland. In July 2009, the cliffs were named one of 28 global finalists in the New Seven Wonders of the World project. The cover art depicts an imaginary landscape with the composer sitting and holding a bouquet of flowers in front of two cliffs, with a Shamrock (a symbol of Ireland) behind him.

External links
 Official Website

References

2010 debut albums